Tsimlyansky (masculine), Tsimlyanskaya (feminine), or Tsimlyanskoye (neuter) may refer to:
Tsimlyansky District, a district of Rostov Oblast, Russia
Tsimlyanskoye Urban Settlement, an administrative division and a municipal formation which the town of Tsimlyansk in Tsimlyansky District of Rostov Oblast, Russia is incorporated as
Tsimlyansky (rural locality), a rural locality (a settlement) in Shpakovsky District of Stavropol Krai, Russia
Tsimlyanskaya, before 1950, name of Tsimlyansk, now a town in Rostov Oblast, Russia
Tsimlyansk Reservoir (or Tsimlyanskoye Reservoir), an artificial lake on the Don River, Russia